Ngweni Ndassi Kadiang (born 12 July 1996) is a Cameroonian footballer who plays for Njala Quan Sports Academy in Cameroon, as a defender.

International

International goals
Score and Result list Cameroon's goal tally first

|-
| 1. || 30 March 2015 || Rajamangala Stadium, Bangkok, Thailand ||  ||  ||  || Friendly
|}

References

External links
 
 

1996 births
Living people
Cameroonian footballers
Cameroon international footballers
Association football defenders